Suzanne Weber is an American politician who is the Oregon state senator in Oregon's 16th district. She assumed office on January 9, 2023. Weber ran for election to the Oregon State Senate to represent District 16. She won in the general election on November 8, 2022. She is a Republican. She was previously a state representative from Oregon's 32nd district.

Oregon House of Representatives
She won the seat after incumbent Democrat Tiffiny Mitchell decided not to run for re-election. She defeated Democrat Debbie Boothe-Schmidt in the 2020 election, winning 54.1% to 45.7% with 0.2% of the vote being for write-in candidates.

Oregon Senate

References

Republican Party members of the Oregon House of Representatives
21st-century American politicians
Living people
Year of birth missing (living people)